Carnivore is the seventh studio album by American heavy metal band Body Count, released on March 6, 2020, by Century Media. The singles "Carnivore" and "Bum-Rush" were released to promote the album.

Background 
Explaining the title, vocalist Ice-T reported to Loudwire in 2018, prior to the album's recording:"It's basically: 'Fuck vegans.' We figure, anything carnivorous pretty much kicks ass. We're carnivorous! I'm not [really] saying 'Fuck vegans.' Everyone's so pussy right now, [so] we're carnivores."
The album art was created by Zbigniew M. Bielak. It is the first album to not feature any songwriting credits for Ernie C.

Critical reception
Carnivore was met with "generally favorable" reviews from critics. At Metacritic, which assigns a weighted average rating out of 100 to reviews from mainstream publications, this release received an average score of 67 based on four reviews. At Album of the Year, the release was given a 59 out of 100 based on a critical consensus of six reviews.

Accolades

The song "Bum-Rush" was nominated for the Grammy Award for Best Metal Performance, later winning the award and making it the band's first Grammy win.

Track listing

Personnel

Body Count
Ice-T – lead vocals
Ernie C – lead guitar
Juan of the Dead – rhythm guitar
Vincent Price – bass, additional voices on "The Hate Is Real"
Ill Will – drums
Sean E Sean – sampler, backing vocals
Little Ice – hype man, backing vocals

Other personnel
Will Putney – production, mixing, mastering, additional guitar
Riley Gale – vocals on "Point the Finger"
Jamey Jasta – vocals on "Another Level"
Amy Lee – vocals on "When I'm Gone"
Jello Biafra – additional voices on "The Hate Is Real"
Jorge Hinojosa – additional voices on "The Hate Is Real"
Hue X – additional voices on "The Hate Is Real"
Trina Scelsi – additional voices on "The Hate Is Real"
Emotional Xan – additional lyrics on "Point the Finger"
Dave Lombardo – additional drums on "Colors"
Josean Orta – additional drums on "Ace of Spades"
Zbigniew Bielak – artwork

Charts

References

2020 albums
Body Count (band) albums
Albums produced by Will Putney
Century Media Records albums